Sardasht-e Nematabad (also Romanized as Sardasht-e Neʿmatābād) is a village in Dalgan Rural District, in the Central District of Dalgan County, Sistan and Baluchestan Province, Iran. At the 2006 census, its population was 283, in 49 families.

References 

Populated places in Dalgan County